The discography of The Wombats, a Liverpool-based indie rock group, consists of six studio albums, ten extended plays and thirty-one singles.

Albums

Studio Albums

Compilation albums

Extended plays

Singles

Promotional singles

Triple J Hottest 100
The Triple J Hottest 100 is an annual music listener poll hosted by national Australian radio station, Triple J, to determine their favourite song of the year. Songs by The Wombats have appeared on numerous occasions.

Notes

Other appearances

References

Discographies of British artists